Aristidis Karageorgos (born 27 July 1951) is a Greek racewalker. He competed in the men's 20 kilometres walk at the 1980 Summer Olympics.

References

External links
 

1951 births
Living people
Athletes (track and field) at the 1980 Summer Olympics
Greek male racewalkers
Olympic athletes of Greece
Place of birth missing (living people)
20th-century Greek people